20 Years: The Greatest Hits is the third greatest hits album by English singer Will Young, released on 27 May 2022. The album commemorates two decades since Young's Pop Idol win. The album contains the majority of Young's biggest hits, but excludes several singles from his career.

Track listing

Charts

See also
List of UK top-ten albums in 2022

References

2022 greatest hits albums
Albums produced by Richard Stannard (songwriter)
Albums produced by Mike Peden
Sony Music compilation albums
Will Young albums